

Current and future destinations

Former destinations

The airline previously served the following destinations with scheduled passenger flights:   

 Atlanta (ATL)
 Chicago (ORD)
 Dallas/Fort Worth (DFW)
 Grand Turk Island (GDT)
 La Ceiba, Honduras (LCE)
 Houston (IAH)
 Orlando (MCO)
 Panama City, Panama (PTY) (Restarting Destination June 2023)
 Providenciales (PLS)
 Washington, D.C. (IAD)

References

Lists of airline destinations